Grachi is a rural locality (a khutor) and the administrative center of Grachyovskoye Rural Settlement, Gorodishchensky District, Volgograd Oblast, Russia. The population was 1,029 as of 2010. There are 23 streets.

Geography 
Grachi is located in steppe, on the Grachi River, 27 km northwest of Gorodishche (the district's administrative centre) by road. Samofalovka is the nearest rural locality.

References 

Rural localities in Gorodishchensky District, Volgograd Oblast